The 2018 Paris Sevens was the final event of the 2017–18 World Rugby Sevens Series and the eleventh edition of the France Sevens. The tournament was held between 9–10 June 2018 at Stade Jean-Bouin, Paris.

Teams
The fifteen core teams will be participating in the tournament, along with one invited team, Ireland.

Pool stages
All times in Central European Summer Time (UTC+02:00). The games as scheduled are as follows:

Pool A

Pool B

Pool C

Pool D

Knockout stage

13th Place

Challenge Trophy

5th Place

Cup

Tournament placings

Source: World Rugby

Players

Scoring leaders

Source: World Rugby

Dream Team
The following seven players were selected to the tournament Dream Team at the conclusion of the tournament:

See also
 2018 France Women's Sevens

References

External links
 Tournament page

Paris
France Sevens
2017–18 in French rugby union
Paris Sevens